Tie Ltd. (previously Transport Initiatives Edinburgh Ltd.) was a Scottish company which, from May 2002 to August 2011, project-managed large-scale transport projects on behalf of the City of Edinburgh Council in Edinburgh. It was brought in as part of a public-private partnership (PPP) to improve Scottish public transport infrastructure development. Following its management of the controversial Edinburgh Trams project, the company was closed down in 2011.Transport for Edinburgh took over the Edinburgh Trams functions from Tie.

Ownership
Tie was a private limited company, wholly owned by the City of Edinburgh Council. It was a non-profit organisation.

It was not connected with Transport Initiatives LLP, an English-based transport planning consultancy specialising in cycling, walking and travel planning.

Projects

Tie was involved in several major transport projects in Scotland including:

Edinburgh Trams
Since construction started in 2008, the Edinburgh Trams project was criticised for delays to the infrastructural works, in particular the closure of Princes Street. Tie underwent some organisational change at this time; in November 2008 Willie Gallagher stepped down as executive chairman. David Mackay, then Chairman of Transport Edinburgh Limited, took over as interim chairman until he was replaced in May 2009 by Richard Jeffrey, who resigned from the post in 2011 after two years in the role. Shortly after Jeffrey's resignation, four non-executive directors and the communications director of tie also resigned, followed by the introduction of a voluntary redundancy scheme aimed at halving the headcount of the company. In August 2011, it was announced that further redundancies would be made, and an international consultancy, Turner & Townsend, was appointed to support the project while tie was relieved of its responsibilities. Following the transfer of Tie responsibilities, the tramway contractor Bilfinger Berger spoke out about Tie management of the tram project and took the view that Tie had a poor risk management strategy and that it had failed to organise the necessary construction work to move the underground utilities prior to tramway construction.

Closure
Following the Edinburgh Trams controversy, Tie was heavily criticised for its handling of the project. In late 2011 Transport Initiatives Edinburgh was disbanded as a company. Tie initially chose not to reveal the severance payment awarded to its directors, but following a Freedom of Information application, it was revealed that the directors of Transport Initiatives Edinburgh received compensation totalling £406,635 after they stepped down from the company.

References

External links
Transport Initiatives Edinburgh

Light rail in the United Kingdom
Public transport in Scotland
Transport in Edinburgh
Tram transport in Scotland
2002 establishments in Scotland
Project management
Companies owned by municipalities of Scotland
Transport companies established in 2002
Defunct companies of Scotland
Defunct public bodies of the United Kingdom
Government agencies disestablished in 2011
Public–private partnership projects in the United Kingdom
Defunct transport companies of the United Kingdom